SK Sulko Zábřeh is a football club located in Zábřeh, Czech Republic. It currently plays in the Olomoucký krajský přebor, which is in the fifth tier of Czech football.

References

External links
 Official website 

Football clubs in the Czech Republic
Association football clubs established in 1919
Šumperk District